The season of 1969–70 was the fifty-seventh occasion on which the Lancashire Cup completion had been held.
Swinton won the trophy  by beating Leigh by the score of 11-2
The match was played at Central Park, Wigan, (historically in the county of Lancashire). The attendance was 13,532 and receipts were £3,651-0s-0d

Background 

The total number of teams entering the competition increased by two, up to the total of 16. This was as a result of inviting two junior (or amateur) clubs, St Helens Amateurs and Maryport.
The same fixture format was retained, and due to the increase in the number of participating clubs, resulted in a full fixture list with no byes or “blank” or “dummy” fixtures.

Competition and results

Round 1 
Involved  8 matches (with no bye or “blank” fixture) and 16 clubs

Round 2 - Quarter-finals 
Involved 4 matches (with no bye) and 8 clubs

Round 3 – Semi-finals  
Involved 2 matches and 4 clubs

Final

Teams and scorers 

Scoring - Try = three (3) points - Goal = two (2) points - Drop goal = two (2) points

The road to success

Notes and comments 
1 * The first Lancashire Cup match to be played at Huyton's newly completed new stadium 
2 * St Helens Amateurs were a junior (or amateur) club 
3 * Maryport a junior (or amateur) club from Cumberland<br/ >
4 * Central Park was the home ground of Wigan with a final capacity of 18,000, although the record attendance was 47,747 for Wigan v St Helens 27 March 1959

See also 
1969–70 Northern Rugby Football League season
Rugby league county cups

References

External links
Saints Heritage Society
1896–97 Northern Rugby Football Union season at wigan.rlfans.com
Hull&Proud Fixtures & Results 1896/1897
Widnes Vikings - One team, one passion Season In Review - 1896-97
The Northern Union at warringtonwolves.org

1969 in English rugby league
RFL Lancashire Cup